The Cathedral of Saint Peter of Beauvais is a Roman Catholic church in the northern town of Beauvais, Oise, France. It is the seat of the Bishop of Beauvais, Noyon and Senlis.

The cathedral is in the Gothic style, and consists of a 13th-century choir, with an apse and seven polygonal apsidal chapels reached by an ambulatory, joined to a 16th-century transept.

It has the highest Gothic choir in the world: (48.50 m) under vault. From 1569 to 1573 the cathedral of Beauvais was, with its tower of 153 meters, the highest human construction of the world. Its designers had the ambition to make it the largest gothic cathedral in France ahead of Amiens. Victim of two collapses, one in the 13th century, the other in the 16th century, it remains unfinished today; only the choir and the transept have been built.

The planned nave of the cathedral was never constructed. The remnant of the previous 10th-century Romanesque cathedral, known as the Basse Œuvre ("Lower Work"), still occupies the intended site of the nave.

History

Work was begun in 1225 under count-bishop Milo of Nanteuil, with funding from his family, immediately after the third in a series of fires in the old wooden-roofed basilica, which had reconsecrated its altar only three years before the fire; the choir was completed in 1272, in two campaigns, with an interval (1232–38) owing to a funding crisis provoked by a struggle with Louis IX. The two campaigns are distinguishable by a slight shift in the axis of the work and by changes in stylistic handwriting. Under Bishop Guillaume de Grez, an extra 4.9 m was added to the height, to make it the highest-vaulted cathedral in Europe. The vaulting in the interior of the choir reaches  in height, far surpassing the concurrently constructed Amiens Cathedral, with its  nave, and making Beauvais Cathedral the tallest vault of all the Gothic Cathedrals. A formerly often-quoted beginning date of 1247 was based on an error made by an early historian of Beauvais.

The work was interrupted in 1284 by the collapse of some of the vaulting of the recently completed choir. This collapse has been seen as a disaster that produced a failure of nerve among the French masons working in Gothic style. The collapse also marked the beginning of an age of smaller structures generally, which was associated with demographic decline, the Hundred Years' War, and with the thirteenth century.

However, large-scale Gothic design continued, and the choir was rebuilt at the same height, albeit with more columns in the chevet and choir, converting the vaulting from quadripartite vaulting to sexpartite vaulting. The transept was built from 1500 to 1548. In 1573, the fall of the 153 m (502 feet) central tower stopped work again. The tower made the church the tallest structure in the world (1569–1573). Afterwards little structural addition was made.

The choir has always been wholeheartedly admired, with Eugène Viollet-le-Duc calling the Beauvais choir "the Parthenon of French Gothic." It inspired the main administration building of Fermilab near Chicago, Illinois, which has been the world's leading high-energy physics laboratory since the 1960s. The building is now called Wilson Hall after Robert R. Wilson, its founding director and a sculptor who insisted on an uplifting aesthetic.  

Its façades, especially that on the south, exhibit all the richness of the late Gothic style. The carved wooden doors of both the north and the south portals are masterpieces, respectively, of Gothic and Renaissance workmanship. The church possesses an elaborate astronomical clock in neo-Gothic taste (1866) and tapestries of the 15th and 17th centuries, but its chief artistic treasures are stained glass windows of the 13th, 14th, and 16th centuries, the most beautiful of them from the hand of Renaissance artist Engrand Le Prince, a native of Beauvais. To him also is due some of the stained glass in St-Etienne, the second church of the town, and an interesting example of the transition stage between the Gothic and the Renaissance styles.

During the Middle Ages, on January 14, the Feast of Asses was annually celebrated in Beauvais Cathedral, in commemoration of the Flight into Egypt.

Structural condition

In the race to build the tallest cathedral in the 13th century, the builders of Saint-Pierre de Beauvais pushed technology to its limits. Even though the structure was to be taller, the buttresses were made thinner in order to pass maximum light into the cathedral. In 1284, only twelve years after completion, part of the choir vault collapsed, along with a few flying buttresses. It is now believed that the collapse was caused by resonant vibrations due to high winds.

The accompanying photograph shows lateral iron supports between the flying buttresses; it is not known when these external tie rods were installed. The technology would have been available at the time of the initial construction, but the extra support might not have been considered necessary until after the collapse in 1284, or even later. In the 1960s, the tie rods were removed; the thinking was that they were ungraceful and unnecessary. However, the oscillations created by the wind became amplified, and the choir partially disassociated itself from the transept. Subsequently, the tie rods were reinstalled, but this time with rods made of steel. Since steel is less ductile than iron, the structure became more rigid, possibly causing additional fissures.

As the floor plan shows, the original design included a nave that was never built. Thus, the absence of shouldering support that would have otherwise been provided by the nave contributes to the structural weakness of the cathedral.

With the passage of time, other problems surfaced, some requiring more drastic remedies. The north transept now has four large wood-and-steel lateral trusses at different heights, installed during the 1990s to keep the transept from collapsing (see photograph below). In addition, the main floor of the transept is interrupted by a much larger brace that rises out of the floor at a 45-degree angle. This brace was installed as an emergency measure to give additional support to the pillars that, until now, have held up the tallest vault in the world.

These temporary measures will remain in place until more permanent solutions can be determined. Various studies are under way to determine with more assurance what can be done to preserve the structure. Columbia University is performing a study on a three-dimensional model constructed using laser scans of the building in an attempt to determine the weaknesses in the building and remedies.

Starting in September 2022 the French government will begin a restoration of the cathedral starting with the roof and removal of the interior supports. Part of the roof was analyzed and restored in a project starting in 2010. The analysis done on the roof included a "multidisciplinary study" of the lead tiles which made up the roof.

Interior
Several of the chapels contain medieval stained glass windows made during the 13th through to the 15th centuries. In a chapel close to the northern entrance, there is a medieval clock (14th – 15th century), possibly the oldest fully preserved and functioning mechanical clock in Europe. In its vicinity, the highly complicated Beauvais astronomical clock with moving figures was installed in 1866.

See also

List of highest church naves

References
Citations

Bibliography
 

 Murray, Stephen: "The Choir of the Church of St.-Pierre, Cathedral of Beauvais: A Study of Gothic Architectural Planning and Constructional Chronology in Its Historical Context", The Art Bulletin 62.4 (December 1980), pp. 533–551

External links

 Cathedral of Beauvais Digital Media Archive (creative commons-licensed photos, laser scans, panoramas), data from a World Monuments Fund/CyArk research partnership
 
 Photographs and drawings of the cathedral
 High-resolution 360° Panoramas and Images of Beauvais Cathedral | Art Atlas

Churches completed in 1272
13th-century Roman Catholic church buildings in France
Roman Catholic cathedrals in France
Unfinished buildings and structures
Gothic architecture in France
Churches in Beauvais
Unfinished cathedrals
1272 establishments in Europe
1270s establishments in France